Dr. K's Exotic Animal ER is an American television series on the Nat Geo Wild network. It premiered on October 4, 2014, and follows Susan Kelleher, the titular Dr. K, and the veterinarians and staff of the Broward Avian and Exotic Animal Hospital located in Deerfield Beach, Florida. An eighth season premiered in September 2019. A separate series, titled Dr. K's Exotic Animal ER: Gloves Off!, premiered in 2016 and consists of enhanced episodes of the original series.

The show's Dr. Lauren Thielen received her own Nat Geo Wild show titled Dr. T, Lone Star Vet, which premiered in October 2019.

Cast 
Source:

Veterinarians 
 Dr. Susan Kelleher D.V.M. ("Dr. K.")
 Dr. Sara Stoneburg, D.V.M.
 Dr. Veronica Pardini, D.V.M.
 Dr. Carlos Salvioli, Invited D.V.M.

Veterinary staff 
 Sandra Young, Office Manager 
 Dyanne Velasquez, Certified Veterinary Technician
 Kristin Runkle, Veterinary Technician 
 Brooke Rowell, Veterinary Technician 
 Ashley Saddler, Veterinary Technician  
 Jamie-Lee, Veterinary Technician
 Jamie Tresky, Receptionist  
 Bailey Godoy, Receptionist
 Jasmine Sommers, Head Receptionist

Narrators 
 Art Edmonds
 Alex Quenga
 Josh Goodman

Episodes

Season 1 (2014)

Season 2 (2015)

Season 3 (2016)

Season 4 (2017)

Season 5 (2018)

Season 6 (2018)

Season 7 (2019)

Season 8 (2019)

Season 9 (2021)

References 

National Geographic (American TV channel) original programming
Nature educational television series
2014 American television series debuts
English-language television shows